The Blooms at Ruyi Pavilion is a 2020 Chinese streaming television series that premiered on iQiyi on October 12, 2020. It tells the story of Fu Rong's prophetic dreams and her relationship with Xu Jin. It is directed by Kin Lung Lam and Tony and features an ensemble cast that includes Ju Jingyi, Zhang Zhehan, Xu Jiaqi, Liu Yichang, Wang Youshuo, and Gong Beibi.

The series was adapted from Xiao Jia Ren's  Chong Hou Zhi Lu (宠后之路). 40 episodes are globally available on iq.com.

Synopsis 
Fu Rong (played by Ju Jingyi), the daughter of Dayu State Heng Jingling, is strong, intelligent, agile and lively. She was injured in an accident and saw a different life in her dream. She thought it was absurd, but she had one event in her dream. After the case came true, she determined to change her fate to protect her family. Fu Rong also dreamed of being buried under the decree of Duke Su Xu Jin (played by Zhang Zhehan) and as a result was determined to stay away from Duke Su, but the red thread of fate brought them closer and closer. With the emergence of the mysterious organization Ruyi Pavilion, a series of incidents cast a layer of mist on Dayu State. Faced with this situation, Fu Rong and Xu Jin joined hands to experience life and death, and face all kinds of hardships in reality together. At the same time, Duke An (played by Liu Yichang) is also secretly setting up a bigger conspiracy. Faced with the hard-to-change fate and the tricks that followed, could Fu Rong and Xu Jin stick to their original aspirations, solve the puzzle, and finally change their mysterious fate.

Main cast 

 Ju Jingyi as Fu Rong
 Zhang Zhehan as Xu Jin
 Xu Jiaqi as Fu Xuan
 Li Yichang as Xu Ping
Gong Beibi as Liu Ruyi
 Wang Youshuo as Wu Baiqi

References 

Chinese television series